The Oxford University Polo Club (often referred to as OUPC) is the Discretionary Full Blue sports club for competitive polo at Oxford University. Founded in 1874, it is one of the four oldest continuing polo clubs worldwide. Its annual Varsity Match against Cambridge University Polo Club, established in 1878, is the second oldest continuing polo fixture in the Western world. It is played at Guards Polo Club, England, usually at the beginning of June.

The last Varsity Match won by Oxford was in 2022, defeating Cambridge 8–2.

A Winter Varsity has also been created due to the growth in Arena Polo. Oxford won the last Winter Varsity title, in 2022, by 21-0, the biggest varsity win in the club history.

History

Early days
 The Oxford University Polo Club was founded in 1874 by Walter Hume Long (1854–1929), later Viscount Long of Wraxall and First Lord of the Admiralty. Together with his group of friends going up from Wiltshire to Oxford, he founded this new club with matches on a cut hay-field in Port Meadow near Wolvercote (Oxford). This field, which was 280 yards long by 170 yards wide was to become the foundation for the club's own pologrounds for decades to come. Later, the ground was prepared with old turf and could be played in all weather conditions as it hardly ever cut up (from 1930 it was also boarded). During the winter months, matches took place on the Bullingdon Club cricket ground, Cowley, as the summer pitch in Port Meadow was subject to flooding from the River Isis. The club played all year round, mostly on hirelings; playing days were Mondays, Wednesdays and Fridays and the number of playing members seems to have averaged about a dozen. First records show that the club was playing in Hurlingham in 1876 as well as organising an exhibition match between Christ Church and Brasenose College at Christ Church Meadow on 1 July 1877. During the first decade, teams consisted of five members until the set up was replaced in 1883 by the modern game of polo.

The Varsity match against Cambridge was initiated in 1877. The match was played at the Bullingdon Cricket Ground in Oxford on 27 November 1877, making it one of the oldest Varsity matches amongst the Blues Sports at Oxford University. From 1878 until 1939, the match was held at the Hurlingham Club, with the exceptions of 1894 and 1900 and during the First World War (1915–1919) when no games were played. As trophies, both clubs awarded commissioned silver coins. The Challenge Cup which is still used today was given by the Hurlingham Club when the match was revived after the war in 1920. Copies of the Challenge Cup were then given to individual players. No trophy was attached to the Oxford University Open Tournament. With a high standard of teams up to 18 goals this tournament was a highlight of the British polo season until the First World War.

From the very beginning of the club many members went on to become first-class polo players. William Kavanagh, who played in the first Varsity match in 1878, became one of the first high-handicapped players and played for England several times against the USA. After helping his side win the 1882 Varsity match, Tommy Hitchcock Sr. soon became one of America's leading players. He captained his national team within three years of leaving and was among the first 10-goal players. His son Thomas Hitchcock, Jr. followed in his father's footsteps. As a 10-goal player he led the U.S. team to victory in the 1921 International Polo Cup, one year after his time at Oxford.

Around 1900, the Oxford team included the three Nickalls brothers, two of whom went on to represent England. Their contribution at university level saw Oxford romp to a 15–0 victory in 1898. Five years later, an American arrived at Oxford who was to become another 10-goal player and more famous than any of his predecessors: Devereux Milburn. Not content with gaining a rowing Blue and being on the swimming team, Milburn guided the polo team to victory in successive Varsity matches, winning by a margin of 14 goals on both occasions. Even swimming and playing polo against the same university on one day was no problem for him. He soon graduated to international level, playing number four for his country in every match between 1909 and 1927. Universally described as "the greatest back there has ever been", in his prime he had no equal. He was a pivotal member of the mighty "Big Four", the greatest side to play during that era, and one that changed the way the back position is played. Previously, the English regarded the back's role as similar to a goalkeeper in football, i.e. to stay by the goal and defend. Whereas before, polo was a gentleman's preoccupation, Milburn made a job of it.

Amongst the club coaches were Captain James Pearce, Lord Cowdray and Winston Churchill, who was a keen polo player himself and who came over to Port Meadow frequently from Blenheim Palace to play polo and to help the Oxford Varsity team "by giving them a good gallop and a pipe-opener before the inter[-Varsity].

Post-war
After the Second World War, the OUPC made a fresh start with the help of Henley Polo Club. The Varsity match was revived in 1951 and played at Woolmers Field through the courtesy of the former Cambridge player George Lucas and at Cowdray Park through the courtesy of Viscount Cowdray, an Old Oxonian who had represented the Dark Blues in the 1930s and who represented the Hurlingham Polo Association as steward and chairman from 1947 to 1957. From 1961 onwards (no match was played in 1960), the venue for the match was decided annually, with the choice alternating between universities. Oxford then preferred Kirtlington Park Polo Club, which became the home of the OUPC in 1954. Since 1994, the Varsity match is played at Guards Polo Club (with exceptions in 1995, 2006 and 2009).

During the late sixties and early seventies, when Charles, Prince of Wales played for the Cambridge side, polo at Oxford enjoyed a winning streak with eight wins in a row. Ironically, one of the strongest teams ever entered saw this streak ending. In 1974, Syed Shahid Ali and Arturo Goetz were both on three goals, with the remaining players one-goalers. Cambridge could only form a team with a total handicap of minus one but were nonetheless victorious. Many of the players from this period are now well-known figures in the polo world. General Sir Redmond Watt played off a two-goal handicap while at university and subsequently became one of the highest rated Old Blue after the war when he peaked at five-goals. Claire Tomlinson (née Lucas), who was rated at nought-goals at university, became one of polo's few true masters of the number one position and the first woman in the world to rise to five goals. She swept away the rule forbidding women in British high-goal and became the first to compete on equal terms with men at the top tier. Her participation in the Varsity Match 1964 as the first female player was a milestone in the history of the match. In 1966, she became the first female captain of OUPC. It was also through the coaching of her father Arthur Lucas and his Easter Vacation Training Camps at Woolmer's Park, at the home of the Lucas family, that many young riders were encouraged to start playing polo at university.

Recent years
Another milestone was reached in 1994: for the first time in the history of any mixed university sport, the Varsity match teams were both captained by women (Jacqui Broughton, Oxford and Emma Tomlinson, Cambridge). In the last decade Oxford had another purple patch with five successive wins in 2007–11. In 2012, the winning streak came to an end when Oxford entered a strong +2 team against a -5 team on the Cambridge side, losing 2–13. The following year saw an unprecedented rise in membership and club activities under the chairmanship of Andreas Kranke, over 100 new members, the establishment of intercollegiate 'Cuppers' and an intercollegiate Winter League. The 2013 Varsity Match was won 11–3 with the help of new addition Lanto Sheridan, who holds the highest handicap reached by post-war players while still at university. History was made in 2016: the match record was broken by Oxford winning the Varsity Match 19-0 and the club also gained Discretionary Full Blue status amongst the Oxford Blues sports. 2016 also saw the launch of a Winter Varsity Match for arena polo and a renewal of the Atlantic Cup, bringing together university teams from Cambridge, Harvard, Oxford and Yale, with Oxford coming out the winner, and for the first time winning the University Challenge Cup at the Goldin Metropolitan Club in Tianjin, China. 2017 saw the beginning of a new Varsity tradition with the inaugural Claire Lucas Ladies Cup at Kirtlington with teams from Cambridge, Oxford and St Andrew's, which Oxford won undefeated. In the same academic year, the LaMartina Varsity was won against Cambridge 5-1 and the University Challenge Cup was won for the second time in a row at the Goldin Metropolitan Club in Tianjin. In 2019 the LaMartina Varsity was won 15–1. In 2020, the Arena Varsity Team of
1. Capucine Granchi [Polo Manager] (1st Year, St. Hugh's), 2. Tamara Gibbons [Chairman] (2nd Year, St. Edmund Hall) & 3. Max Rumsey [Captain] (1st Year, Balliol) achieved 3 accomplishments, previously unattained throughout OUPC history. Firstly, they won the Open division at the universities' National Championships, out of 202 teams competing across all divisions. Secondly, they maintained a completely unbeaten season, across all matches & tournaments. Thirdly, they won the accolade "Blues Team of the Year" at the Oxford University Sports Awards, thus reputing them to be "the best sports team at Oxford University". Their chance to win the Varsity was cut short due to COVID-19 restrictions. The second Varsity after the pandemic was won by Oxford 8–2, with the Varsity series currently standing at 66:57 in Oxford's favour.

Training
The club caters for players of all ability levels, even complete beginners who have no experience in riding. Polo sessions including club chukkas are held throughout the year. These are run in conjunction with polo professional and H.P.A. Coach David Ashby and The Oxford Polo School, based at Kirtlington Park Polo Club. Athletes have the opportunity to attend additional theory lessons during term time as well as an intense training camp during the vacations.
The club genuinely desires to broaden public participation in the sport, both to increase the standard of play and to go against the traditional social and economic exclusivity associated with the game.
Arena polo (or indoor polo) is an affordable option for many who wish to play the sport, and the club offers reduced lesson prices for students and helps covering the entry fees for tournaments. The result is that the popularity of the club has grown steadily since the 2010s and the club has more than 100 active members (June 2013).

Varsity match

 The match format is extremely unusual as it is traditionally not handicapped. Teams are also mixed which is rare opportunity amongst the Oxford University Blues sports.  The original conditions were:
"No player eligible who has been a member of his University for more than four years, or who has not been in residence during the term in which the match takes place. Instituted in 1878. Played generally at Hurlingham, in June."

Currently, polo is a Discretionary Full Blue sport at Oxford University. A maximum of 4 Half Blues can be awarded at the discretion of the captain with regards to the impact made in the 'A' Varsity team. One Discretionary Full Blue may be awarded to a member of the Varsity 'A' team at the Chairman's discretion, providing that the Varsity match is won and they have a handicap of 0 or above. No Half Blues are offered to the members of the 2nd or 3rd team.

Oxford and Cambridge take it in turns to host the B-Team Varsity event on a separate weekend during Trinity Term. The Old Blues match serves as the traditional curtain raiser for Varsity Day.

Cuppers
The Club runs termly inter-college polo competitions, or 'Cuppers'. In Michaelmas and Hilary Term (Arena Polo Season) it stages an intercollegiate Winter League. In Trinity Term (Outdoor Polo Season) it conducts an event on grass as a knockout competition on one weekend only. Colleges enter teams of three players. Only one guest from another college is allowed or the team runs under the category of a mixed team.

Nationals and fixtures
The Club competes in numerous exhibition matches and tournaments every year all over the UK, and increasingly abroad. Within the UK the Club participates in the two main university tournaments, the Winter Nationals in Hilary and the Summer Nationals in Trinity organised by SUPA, the Schools and Universities Polo Association. Regular fixtures against other clubs include the British Army at Sandhurst, Brookes University, Universities of London, and Skidmore College.

Inaugurated in 2002, the Atlantic Cup is traditionally played between Oxford, Cambridge, Yale and (since 2016) Harvard. The university clubs take it in rounds to organize the event making transatlantic travel arrangements for the visiting teams and helping them to arrange their mounts.

Starting in 2013 with the inaugural Metropolitan Intervarsity Polo Tournament, the Club plays against the strongest student run polo clubs from around the world at the Goldin Metropolitan Polo Club in Tianjin, China every year in July. Oxford was able to win the challenge for the first time in 2016. Active members and alumni compete all over the world, most recently at the British Polo Day in Dubai, Singapore, Nihiwatu, India, Mexico and the Jaeger-LeCoultre Gold Cup.

In fiction
In the 1917 novel of Hilda M. Sharp, "The Stars in their Courses" (published by G. P. Putnam's) the young Hon. Patrick Kirkpatrick is a dashing horse rider and polo player at Christ Church, Oxford who runs himself into debts through gambling and his love for polo and hunting.

Author F. Scott Fitzgerald loosely modeled two characters in his books on Tommy Hitchcock, Jr.: Tom Buchanan in The Great Gatsby (1925) and the Tommy Barban character in Tender Is the Night (1934).

Notable players and alumni
 Walter Long, 1st Viscount Long, Christ Church (1854–1924)
 Thomas Hitchcock, Sr., Brasenose (1860–1941)
 William Cavendish-Bentinck, 6th Duke of Portland, Christ Church (1857–1943)
 Douglas Haig, 1st Earl Haig, Brasenose (1861–1928)
 Charles Trefusis, 21st Baron Clinton, (1863–1957)
 Piers Alexander, Viscount Valletort, (1865–1944)
 Simon Fraser, 14th Lord Lovat, Magdalen (1871–1933)
 George Child Villiers, 8th Earl of Jersey, Balliol (1873–1923)
 Patteson Womersley Nickalls, New College (1877–1946)
 Charles Duncombe, 2nd Earl of Feversham, Christ Church (1879–1916)
 Waldorf Astor, 2nd Viscount Astor, New College (1879–1952)
 Thomas Agar-Robartes, Christ Church (1880–1915)
 Devereux Milburn, Lincoln (1881–1942)
 Rajendra Narayan II, Maharaja of Cooch Behar, Christ Church (1882–1913)
 Neil Primrose, New College (1882–1917)
 Harold Pearson, 2nd Viscount Cowdray, Christ Church (1882–1933)
 George Bampfylde, 4th Baron Poltimore, New College (1882–1965)
 Robert Hudson, 1st Viscount Hudson, Magdalen (1880–1957)
 Archibald Leslie-Melville, 13th Earl of Leven, Christ Church (1890–1947)
 Prince Serge Obolensky, Christ Church (1890–1978)
 Edward VIII, Magdalen (1894–1972)
 Tommy Hitchcock, Jr., Brasenose (1900–1944)
 Francis Hastings, 16th Earl of Huntingdon, Christ Church (1901–1990)
 Weetman Pearson, 3rd Viscount Cowdray, Christ Church (1910–1995)
 Charles Wood, 2nd Earl of Halifax, Christ Church (1912–1980)
 George Petty-Fitzmaurice, 8th Marquess of Lansdowne, Christ Church (1912–1997)
 Arthur Budgett, Christ Church (1916–2011)
 George Haig, 2nd Earl Haig, Christ Church (1918–2009)
 Peter Palumbo, Baron Palumbo, Worcester (b. 1935)
 Arturo Goetz, Jesus (1944 – 2014)
 Claire Tomlinson, Somerville (1944–2022)
 H.R.H. Prince Hassan bin Talal, Christ Church (b. 1947)
 Redmond Watt, Christ Church (b. 1950)
 H.R.H. Sultan Abdullah of Pahang, Worcester (b. 1959)
 Richard Rowley, (b. 1959)
 Allanah Weston, Merton (b. 1972)
 François Perrodo, St Peter's (b. 1977)
 Lanto Sheridan, Harris Manchester (b. 1988)
 Hon. Richard Vere Harmsworth, St Peter's (b. 1994)

References
Notes

Bibliography

External links
 Official website of OUPC
 Oxford University Polo Club on Twitter

Polo Club
Polo clubs in the United Kingdom
Sports clubs established in 1874
1874 establishments in England